Nazar Ali Bolaghi (also Romanized as Naz̧ar ‘Alī Bolāghī; also known as Naz̧ar Bolāgh) is a village in Qeshlaq-e Jonubi Rural District, Qeshlaq Dasht District, Bileh Savar County, Ardabil Province, Iran. At the 2006 census, its population was 319, in 84 families.

References 

Tageo

Towns and villages in Bileh Savar County